Şekerpare is one of the popular desserts in the Turkish cuisine. Mainly prepared by baking some soft balls of almond based pastry dipped in thick lemon-flavored sugar syrup, şekerpare is pronounced “sheh-kehr-PAH-reh” in Turkish.

References

See also
Shekerbura
List of Turkish desserts
 

Bosnia and Herzegovina cuisine
Middle Eastern cuisine
Turkish pastries
Turkish desserts
Turkish words and phrases
Albanian snack foods
Almond desserts